The Piel CP-30 Emeraude (French: émeraude = "emerald") is an aircraft designed in France in the mid-1950s and widely built both by factories and homebuilders.

Design and development
The Emeraude is a low-wing cantilever monoplane with fixed tailwheel undercarriage and side-by-side seating for two. The aircraft uses wood construction with a laminated box spar with an elliptical trailing edge. The prototype was designed and built by Claude Piel, who then licensed manufacture of the aircraft to a number of firms, most significantly Coopavia. These early production machines were similar to the prototype, but were fitted with more powerful engines.

The first major revision of the design was the Super Emeraude, designed by Piel while working at Scintex in the early 1960s. It featured a strengthened airframe and cleaned-up aerodynamics, allowing it to be certified for aerobatics. Much of Scintex's Super Emeraude production was contracted out to CAARP, where the design eventually served as the basis for the CAP-10.

Emeraudes were also produced in the United Kingdom (by Fairtravel as the Linnet) and in South Africa by General Aircraft ("Genair") of Virginia Airport as the Aeriel 2 with imported engines, the first aircraft to be manufactured entirely in that country. The Linnet was modified by the Garland Aircraft Company, formed by P.A.T Garland and D.E. Bianchi, to meet British airworthiness requirements. The first aircraft (G-APNS) was built at White Waltham and first flown on 1 September 1958 by Squadron Leader Neville Duke. Two more aircraft were planned but only one more was built by Garland-Bianchi in 1962. Between 1963 and 1965 three more aircraft were built with 100-hp Rolls-Royce Continental O-200-A engines. The last two aircraft had one-piece sliding cockpit canopies.

Operational history
Reviewers Roy Beisswenger and Marino Boric described the design in a 2015 review as "It is not quick to build, as the timber construction is rather complicated because of the complex forms, but in aesthetic  terms it is undoubtedly a success."

Variants

 

CP-30 – prototype with Continental A65 engine (one built)
CP-301
CP-301A – initial production version with Continental C90 engine (118 built)
CP-301B – version by Rousseau with sliding canopy, spatted undercarriage and other refinements (23 built)
CP-301C – version by Scintex with bubble canopy and revised cowling, wings and tail (84 built)
CP-301S – Smaragd version by Binder Aviatik KG / Schempp Hirth Continental C-90 engine, sliding canopy, upper part of rear fuselage in fibreglass including a dorsal fin and other refinements (25 built)
CP-304 – homebuilt version with Continental C85 engine
CP-305   homebuilt version with Lycoming O-235  engine
CP-308
CP-315 – this version was powered by a 78-kW (105-hp) Potez piston engine; only one CP-315 was built by Scintex Aviation.
CP-320 – Emeraude fuselage with Super Emeraude wings
CP-320A – CP-320 with swept fin
CP-321 – CP-320 with Potez engine
CP-323 – CP-320 with 140–160 hp O-320 Lycoming engine
CP-323A – CP-323 with bubble canopy
CP-324 – Emeraude Club with JPX 2100 engine
CP-328A
CP-1310 – Super Emeraude by Scintex with Continental O-200 (23 built)
CP-1315 – Super Emeraude with Potez 4E engine (17 built)
CP-1320 – Saphir the Super Emeraude with cabin and wings from Piel Diamant design
CP-1330 – Super Emeraude with Lycoming O-235 engine

British production
Garland-Bianchi Linnet – design based on the Piel Emeraude with a 90 hp Continental C-90-14F engine, two built.
Fairtravel Linnet – further production powered by a 100 hp Rolls-Royce Continental O-200-A engines, three built.

Specifications (Scintex C.P. 301 C1)

See also

References

 
 
 
 
 A.J. Jackson, British Civil Aircraft since 1919 Volume 2, 1974, Putnam, London, page 308 and 513

External links

 Cockpit picture of a Piel-Emeraude CP305
 French Piel website forum

1950s French sport aircraft
Piel aircraft
Homebuilt aircraft
Low-wing aircraft
Single-engined tractor aircraft
Aerobatic aircraft
Aircraft first flown in 1954